Sandro Torrente (born 13 May 1998) is a South African rower and went to St Benedict's college in South Africa where he was the rowing captain in his under 19 rowing year. He competed in boat race and South African Schools Rowing regatta where he won gold in both. He also competed in junior world where he won bronze. More recently he competed at the 2020 Summer Olympics, held July–August 2021 in Tokyo.

References

1998 births
Living people
Sportspeople from Pretoria
Rowers at the 2020 Summer Olympics
South African male rowers
Olympic rowers of South Africa